Arthur Frederic St. Claire Evens (born July 20, 1899, New York, died October 18, 1950, Los Angeles, age 51) was a screenwriter who wrote the script for the Frank Buck adventure thriller Tiger Fangs.

Early years
Arthur Frederic St. Claire Evens was the only child of Edward and Louise Evens. On the 1920 US census Edward Evens listed his occupation as investigator for the US Government. Arthur Evens served in the US Army overseas during World War I, Jan 1918 - March 1919.

Wife's Suicide
Arthur Evens was in the headlines, June 1927, when his wife of 3 months, Helen St. Claire, an actress, age 22, died in her bathroom, 2235 N. Cahuenga Boulevard, after a marital spat by swallowing a bottle of antiseptic lotion. Arthur told the police of a lovers’ quarrel and declared that their lives had been unhappy due to parental enmity (in particular, on the part of the wife’s father, Albert T. Daniels). Helen was buried in New York. In February 1928, Helen's parents supplied new information to police about Helen's death, but in April, a coroner's jury ruled that Helen ended her own life. Arthur thereupon married Iris Ashton Badger, a 29-year-old actress with whom he had been living for months. At the same time, he was convicted of vagrancy and sentenced to 60 days in jail.

Screenplays

Arthur Evens, who used the name Arthur St. Claire, wrote scenarios in Hollywood from the 1920s until the late 1940s. He recycled some of the events of his wife's suicide in fictional form in his screenplay, Delinquent Daughters (1944), the story of how a town is shocked when a high school girl commits suicide.

Many of St. Claire’s screenplays were B-movies for Producers Releasing Corporation. He is best remembered today for writing Tiger Fangs, a candidate for the national film registry.

Selected filmography
 Secrets of a Model (1940)
 Sweethearts of the U.S.A. (1944)
 Philo Vance's Gamble (1947)

References

External links

1899 births
1950 deaths
American male screenwriters
Screenwriters from New York (state)
Writers from New York City
20th-century American male writers
20th-century American screenwriters